The Prince Chun Mansion, also known as the Northern Mansion (北府, Běifǔ), is a large residence in the siheyuan style with lavish private garden located near the Shichahai neighborhood in central Beijing.  The grounds had been part of a villa built by Mingju, an official in the court of Emperor Kangxi. It would later be seized by Heshen, a favorite of Emperor Qianlong, and following Heshen's purge and execution in 1799, it would be bestowed on Yongxing, Prince Cheng, by his brother, the Emperor Jiaqing, and the mansion was renovated. The mansion would change hands several times, eventually ending up as the residence of a minor Qing official named Yusu. In 1888, was granted to Yixuan, Prince Chun, the biological father of the Emperor Guangxu, by his sister-in-law, Empress Dowager Cixi.  In 1891, the First Prince Chun died, and his title and the mansion was inherited by his second surviving son, Zaifeng. It was at the mansion, in 1906, Puyi, the last Qing emperor, was born to Zaifeng. 

Prince Chun would serve as regent for Puyi, from Puyi's accession in 1908, until the overthrow of the dynasty in 1912. Despite the collapse of the Qing Dynasty, Chun would be allowed to stay in the mansion, and he died there in 1951. 

Its garden became the residence of Soong Ching-ling, the widow of Sun Yat-sen, between 1963 and her death in 1981; it is now a public museum as her former residence open to visitors.

External links
 The Vicissitudes of Prince Chun's Mansion

Xicheng District
Buildings and structures in Beijing
Museums in Beijing
Historic house museums in China
Major National Historical and Cultural Sites in Beijing